West Vindex is an unincorporated community in Garrett County, Maryland, United States.

External links

Unincorporated communities in Garrett County, Maryland
Unincorporated communities in Maryland